Sinezona brevis is a species of minute sea snail, a marine gastropod mollusc in the family Scissurellidae.

Description
The white shell reaches a height of 1 mm. The solid shell has a depressed, turbinate shape. It is openly perforate to imperforate. The sculpture shows distant longitudinal lamellate ribs that cross the whorl  from the suture to the umbilicus. Their interstices contain raised spiral threads, which grow coarser on approaching the umbilicus. The protoconch contains 1½ whorl, concluding with a prominent varix. The three whorls are tabulate above, and rounded below. The body whorl descends rapidly. The aperture is roundly ovate. The sharp outer lip is convex. The inner lip spreads as a distinct callosity over the body, and sometimes seals the umbilicus partly or wholly up. The columella is concave. The narrow umbilicus is deep, and is bordered with a raised ridge, or is closed up. The
foramen is large, and distant from the margin, to which a furrow joins it. The fasciole is extremity short, terminating half a whorl behind the aperture. it is bordered
by keels and is traversed by lamellae, which correspond to the longitudinal ribs.

Distribution
This marine species occurs off New Zealand.

References

 Powell A. W. B., New Zealand Mollusca, William Collins Publishers Ltd, Auckland, New Zealand 1979 
 Marshall,B. A., 2002. Some recent scissurellids from the New Zealand region and remarks on some scissurellid genus group names (Mollusca:Gastropoda:Vestigastropoda). Molluscan Research 22:165-181
 Geiger D.L. (2012) Monograph of the little slit shells. Volume 1. Introduction, Scissurellidae. pp. 1-728. Volume 2. Anatomidae, Larocheidae, Depressizonidae, Sutilizonidae, Temnocinclidae. pp. 729–1291. Santa Barbara Museum of Natural History Monographs Number 7

External links
 

Scissurellidae
Gastropods of New Zealand
Gastropods described in 1904